Atyap Chiefdom is a Nigerian traditional state of the Atyap people, located on the upper Kaduna River basin of the central Nigeria plateau in the Middle Belt. Its headquarters is at A̠tak Njei, Zangon Kataf, southern Kaduna state, Nigeria.

People

History
The Atyap Chiefdom was created in 1995. In 2007, it was upɡraded to a First Class status.

Government
The Atyap Chiefdom is run by the Atyap Traditional Council, with the A̠gwatyap as its head.

Administrative divisions

Districts

The Kaduna state Ministry of Local Government Affairs gave its number of Existing Districts as 16, Approved Districts as five and Approved Village Units as 61.

These are the districts between 1995 and 2017:

However, these are the current five Government-Approved Districts from 2017 onwards, trimmed down by the incumbent Kaduna State governor Nasir Elrufai who accordingly said, as reported by Premium Times, Nigeria that the committee set up to address the district administration in the state concluded that the proliferation of the number of districts from the pre-2001 era had created a financial burden for Local Government Councils. Hence, their reversal back to the pre-2001 era. Viz:

Headquarters
The headquarters of the Atyap Chiefdom is Atak Njei, where the Agwatyap'''s palace (Tyap: Magwatyap) is located.

Of recent, there had been moves by the Nasir el-Rufai-led Kaduna State government to question the locating of the palace in that very region located at the outskirts of the Hausa-Fulani-Kanuri dominated town of Zangon Kataf (Tyap: Á̠nietcen-A̱fakan), a move which has strongly been countered by the Atyap Community Development Association (ACDA).

Rulership
Royal houses
Atyap Chiefdom consists of four royal houses divided according to the four clans of the Atyap people, namely:

Rulers
The ruling monarchs of the Atyap Chiefdom are known as A̠gwatyap.

The word is derived from these two Tyap words: a̱gwam (i.e. a monarch) and A̱tyap'' (i.e. after the Atyap people) and literally means "monarch of the Atyap".

List of rulers
The names of these rulers who reigned from 1995 till date are as follows:

See also
 Abwoi religion
 Ayet Atyap annual cultural festival
 Southern Kaduna
 The 1992 Zangon Kataf crises

References

External links

Nigerian traditional states
Atyap people 
Kaduna State
Monarchies_of_Africa
Atyap chiefdom